The Fidelity Ultimate Chess Challenge is a chess video game released in 1991 by Telegames for the Atari Lynx. Players can either play against the game or against another player using the same console. The game engine was written by Fidelity Electronics, makers of various chess computers, and reached a master rating of 2325 Elo.

Gameplay

The program has 17 levels of play. Eight of them are time based level setting the average response time from 5 seconds (level time 1) to 4 minutes (level 8). The eight following levels restrict the program ability to look ahead. For example, level depth 1 restricts the program to 1 ply or 1 half move, level depth 2  restricts the computer to 2 plies or 2 half moves, and so on to level depth 8. The 17th level is an infinite level, the computation can either be stopped by the user or by the finding of a forced mate.

Development and release

Reception 

The Fidelity Ultimate Chess Challenge was met with mostly positive reception. Robert A. Jung reviewed the game which was published to IGN, in his final verdict he wrote; "Telegames has made a respectable entry into the Lynx game market with this title. As a chess game, The Fidelity Ultimate Chess Challenge fits the bill. It plays a strong, challenging game, though it presumes some knowledge of chess on your part. The lack of a board set-up option, however, is inexcusable; it could have been added with very little effort. However, if you can live with this omission, and want to play chess on the go, then Fidelity Chess is a good solution." Giving a final score of 7 out of 10.

References

External links 
 The Fidelity Ultimate Chess Challenge at AtariAge
 The Fidelity Ultimate Chess Challenge at GameFAQs
 The Fidelity Ultimate Chess Challenge at MobyGames

1991 video games
Atari Lynx games
Atari Lynx-only games
Chess software
Multiplayer and single-player video games
Telegames games
Video games developed in the United States